The 2005 New York Jets season was the franchise's 36th season in the National Football League (NFL), the 46th season overall, and the fifth and final under head coach Herman Edwards. The Jets were attempting to improve upon their 10–6 record from 2004 but failed to do so, and finished the season with a 4–12 record and missing the playoffs.

Offseason

NFL Draft

Staff

Roster

Preseason

Regular season
In addition to their regular games with AFC East rivals, the Jets played teams from the AFC West and NFC South as per the schedule rotation, and also played intraconference games against the Ravens and the Jaguars based on divisional positions from 2004.

Schedule

Note: Intra-division opponents are in bold text.

Standings

External links
 2005 team stats

New York Jets seasons
New York Jets
New York Jets season
21st century in East Rutherford, New Jersey
Meadowlands Sports Complex